Donald Lee Gambril (born January 2, 1934) is an American former swimming coach.

He was the 1984 U.S. Olympic Coach and Assistant U.S. Olympic Coach in 1968, 1972, 1976, and 1980. Gambril coached many well-known Olympic swimmers, such as Mark Spitz, Sharon Stouder, and Gunnar Larsson (Sweden), Matt Biondi, Nancy Hogshead, Jonty Skinner (South Africa), Hans Fassnacht (Germany) and Mary T. Meagher. 

Gambril was head coach at Long Beach State before a two-year stint from 1971 to 1973 as head coach at Harvard University.  In 1973, Gambril became head coach at the University of Alabama, where he coached the men's team for 17 years and the women's team for 11 years, retiring from coaching in 1990. He has been inducted into the International Swimming Hall of Fame and received the USA Swimming Award in 1983.

See also
 List of members of the International Swimming Hall of Fame

References

Further reading

External links
 

1934 births
Living people
Alabama Crimson Tide swimming coaches
American Olympic coaches
American swimming coaches
Long Beach State Beach swimming coaches
Harvard Crimson swimming coaches
People from Labette County, Kansas